Schistura longa is a species of ray-finned fish, a stone loach, in the genus Schistura. It can be found in gravelly, mountain streams in China.

References

L
Fish described in 1982